Ronny Leonel Paulino (born April 21, 1981) is a Dominican former professional baseball catcher. He played in Major League Baseball (MLB) for the Pittsburgh Pirates, Florida Marlins, New York Mets and Baltimore Orioles. He is currently the bench coach and hitting coach for the Rancho Cucamonga Quakes in the Los Angeles Dodgers organization.

Career

Pittsburgh Pirates: 1997–2008
Paulino signed as a non-drafted free agent with the Pittsburgh Pirates organization on December 29, 1997, at the age of 16. In 2002, he was selected by the Kansas City Royals in the Rule 5 draft, but he was returned to the Pirates in spring training of the following year. After making his major league debut in September 2005 with the Pirates, Paulino was selected to the Dominican Republic team for the 2006 World Baseball Classic as a backup catcher.  The highlight of the World Baseball Classic for Paulino came on March 13, when Paulino started at catcher against the Cuban team. Paulino went 2–2 with a double, three walks, and a run scored in the Dominican's triumph over Cuba. On April 16, 2006, Paulino was recalled to the Major Leagues and quickly became the Pirates every day catcher. Eventually he was again demoted to Triple-A Indianapolis, as management would give Ryan Doumit the bulk of playing time behind the plate with the Pittsburgh Pirates.

Paulino was praised by the Pirates pitching staff as an excellent catcher to work with. The staff earned run average (ERA) was markedly better when Paulino was behind the plate.

His .310 batting average made him the first rookie catcher since Mike Piazza to play in at least 100 games and bat at least .310. He is only the second rookie catcher since 1969 to have those numbers.

Florida Marlins: 2009–10
On December 10, 2008, Paulino was traded to the Philadelphia Phillies in exchange for minor league catcher Jason Jaramillo. He was then traded to the San Francisco Giants on March 27, 2009 for pitcher Jack Taschner. Two hours later he was traded to the Florida Marlins for pitcher Hector Correa.

With the Marlins, Pauline platooned with left-handed hitting catcher John Baker. After Baker suffered a season-ending injury in May 2010, Paulino took over starting duties for the majority of the season. On August 20, 2010, Paulino received a 50-game suspension for violation of baseball's drug policy. Paulino claimed the positive test was a result of a dietary pill.

New York Mets: 2011
In December 2010, the New York Mets signed Paulino to a one-year contract. On May 1, 2011, in a game against the Philadelphia Phillies, Paulino went 5–7 and hit the game-winning RBI in the 14th inning in his first game as with the Mets. With the news of the death of Osama bin Laden, the al-Qaeda leader who was the mastermind of the September 11 attacks circulating during the game against their rivals, Mets manager Terry Collins said that Paulino delivered "a good win for us, and obviously a huge win for America tonight."

On June 8, Paulino hit his first home run with the Mets, a three-run home run off of the Milwaukee Brewers Kameron Loe.

Paulino became a free agent after the Mets decided not to tender his contract.

Baltimore Orioles: 2012
The Baltimore Orioles signed Paulino to a minor league contract on January 30, 2012. He also received an invitation to spring training, but arrived three weeks late to camp after having visa issues. Paulino made the Orioles 2012 Opening Day roster after Taylor Teagarden, newly signed by the team to be the backup catcher, went on the disabled list because of back problems. In the second game of the 2012 season, Paulino made his first start of the year as the DH and went 4–4. On July 15, 2012, Paulino was optioned to Triple-A Norfolk to make room for Taylor Teagarden, who was coming off from the 60-day disabled list.

Seattle Mariners
Paulino signed with the Seattle Mariners after the 2012 season but was released in March 2013.

Baltimore Orioles
Paulino signed with the Baltimore Orioles on May 15, 2013 to a minor league contract.

Detroit Tigers
In August 2013, the Orioles assigned Paulino to the Toledo Mud Hens, the Detroit Tigers Triple-A affiliate. He re-signed with the Tigers in November 2013 to fill minor league organizational depth. On February 12, 2014, Paulino was suspended 100 games by Major League Baseball for a second PED-related offense.

On July 19, 2014, Paulino was released.

Sultanes de Monterrey
On April 28, 2015, Paulino signed with the Sultanes de Monterrey of the Mexican Baseball League.

Vaqueros Laguna
On May 3, 2016, Paulino signed with the Vaqueros Laguna of the Mexican Baseball League. He was released on June 27, 2016.

Olmecas de Tabasco
On July 1, 2016, Paulino signed with the Olmecas de Tabasco of the Mexican Baseball League. He was released on February 27, 2017.

Coaching career
On February 7, 2023, Paulino was hired by the Los Angeles Dodgers organization to serve as the bench coach and hitting coach for their Single-A affiliate, the Rancho Cucamonga Quakes.

International career
He was selected Dominican Republic national baseball team at 2002 Central American and Caribbean Games, 2006 World Baseball Classic, 2019 Pan American Games Qualifier and 2019 Pan American Games.

References

External links

1981 births
Living people
Altoona Curve players
Azucareros del Este players
Baltimore Orioles players
Baseball players at the 2019 Pan American Games
Bowie Baysox players
Buffalo Bisons (minor league) players
Central American and Caribbean Games bronze medalists for the Dominican Republic
Central American and Caribbean Games medalists in baseball
Competitors at the 2002 Central American and Caribbean Games
Dominican Republic expatriate baseball players in Mexico
Dominican Republic expatriate baseball players in the United States
Florida Marlins players
Gulf Coast Pirates players
Hickory Crawdads players
Indianapolis Indians players

Leones del Escogido players
Lynchburg Hillcats players
Major League Baseball catchers
Major League Baseball players from the Dominican Republic
Mexican League baseball catchers
New York Mets players
Norfolk Tides players
Piratas de Campeche players
Pittsburgh Pirates players
St. Lucie Mets players
Sultanes de Monterrey players
Tigres del Licey players
Toledo Mud Hens players
Vaqueros Laguna players
World Baseball Classic players of the Dominican Republic
2006 World Baseball Classic players
Pan American Games competitors for the Dominican Republic
Sportspeople from Santo Domingo